Ted Mineo (born 1981 in New Orleans, Louisiana) is an American artist. He is based in New York City.

About 
Ted Mineo grew up in Marrero, Louisiana, a small town near New Orleans. He attended the Maryland Institute College of Art in Baltimore, Maryland, earning a Bachelor of Fine Arts degree in 2002. He then began graduate work at Yale University in the School of Art at age 21, earning a Master of Fine Arts degree in 2004. His works have been exhibited in Miami Beach, Florida, and at an art museum in Chelsea, Manhattan. Mineo exhibits with Deitch Projects in SoHo, New York.

References

External links 
 Artworks (official website)

1981 births
Living people
Artists from New Orleans
Artists from New York City
People from Marrero, Louisiana
Maryland Institute College of Art alumni
Yale University alumni